The Story of a Boy is a 1919 Norwegian drama film written and directed by Peter Lykke-Seest, starring his son Esben Lykke-Seest.  The film is extant.

The film was screened as part of a retrospective of 100-year-old films at the Il Cinema Ritrovato film festival in 2019.

Cast 
 Esben Lykke-Seest as Esben 
 Lila Lykke-Seest as Esben's mother
 Hans Ingi Hedemark as the boatman 
 Emil Schibbye as the skipper of the Bella Rosa

References

External links
 
 

1919 films
1910s adventure drama films
Norwegian silent films
Norwegian black-and-white films
Norwegian adventure drama films
1919 drama films
Silent drama films